The Conroe Independent School District's Academy of Science and Technology, located in The Woodlands, Texas is a magnet school in science and technology; it is also a member of the National Consortium of Specialized STEM Schools (NCSSS). It was founded at Oak Ridge High School in 1987 with the first graduates in 1991. The AST relocated to The Woodlands College Park High School in stages from 2005 to 2007. The first Headmaster in 1991 was Dr. Ron Laugen who was succeeded in 2007 by Dr. Susan Caffery.

Math, science, and electives in these areas are taught mainly only to students from the Academy. All other courses are taken with the high school along with students who are not in the magnet program.

Candidates are accepted by the Academy of Science and Technology following application, testing, and essay reviewing. Some candidates are interviewed by two faculty members before being accepted. For each class, 65 students are initially accepted, and ten are wait-listed. The size of each class at a given time is between 65 and 77 students. There are approximately 280 students in the Academy, selected from College Park High School, the Woodlands High School and Oak Ridge High School.

Additional requirements

Research and Problems
Each AST student is required to complete a Research and Problems project for local credit each year. In the first year, all are required to do science fair. Many students proceed to the Science and Engineering Fair of Houston after district competition at the Sci:// Tech Exposition. The Academy of Science and Technology has a strong record of having students in all grades proceed to the ExxonMobil Texas State Science and Engineering Fair and the Intel International Science and Engineering Fair.
Other options upperclassmen have for fulfilling their Research And Problems requirement include BEST Robotics, FIRST Robotics Competition, Quiz Bowl, Destination Imagination, Engineering Design Competition, Biotechnology Competition, and Envirothon Competition.

Explorations
14 "Exploration credits" must be earned by each student for local credit to graduate from the AST. These credits are earned through several means: Job shadowing in a technical, scientific, or medical field; documented and researched exploration trips to places such as Alaska, the Galapagos Islands, The Grand Canyon, Colorado, Peru, and Belize; scientific lectures; short day trips to scientific laboratories or companies; college visits; attending approved lectures on scientific topics; and approved student-proposed explorations that are relevant to scientific fields.

Internship
All students are also required to complete an internship in the technical, medical, or scientific community of at least 80 hours. It is usually done in the area of interest of the student. Students have completed internships at NASA, Memorial Hermann and St. Luke's hospitals, the National Zoo, and many local businesses. The internship is normally done during the summer between the junior and senior years. In order to fulfill the requirement, students must keep a detailed journal of their daily experiences.

Fish Camp
As a means of being "inducted" into the Academy, all incoming students are expected to attend a three-day camp. It is held about three weeks prior to the start of each school year and campers consist mainly of incoming freshmen, as well as newly accepted upperclassmen. AST upperclassmen volunteer to serve as counselors to the new students. Various outdoor activities take place in the three days, including a ropes course (high and low elements) and other team building exercises. The purpose of this two-and-a-half-day camp is for new students to meet upperclassmen, to interact with each other, and to promote the four virtues that are pivotal to AST: Teamwork, Responsibility, Integrity, and Perseverance (TRIP). Through writing a report on the experience, incoming freshmen may earn their first 2 "Exploration credits" towards graduation from AST.

Other activities
AST students are active in such clubs as Mu Alpha Theta, Interact, Leo Club as well as Literary Club and many other clubs the host school has to offer. In addition, they participate in the host school's activities, including band, choir, drama, chess club, and athletics.

References

External links
Conroe Independent School District
Academy of Science and Technology

Conroe Independent School District high schools
Magnet schools in Texas
Conroe, Texas